Jerry Jumadeen (born 28 February 1978) is a Trinidadian cricketer. He played in one first-class match for Trinidad and Tobago in 1999/00.

See also
 List of Trinidadian representative cricketers

References

External links
 

1978 births
Living people
Trinidad and Tobago cricketers